Pascal Blanc may refer to:

 Pascal blanc, a white French wine grape variety
 Pascal Blanc (politician) (born 1959), French politician and engineer